2013 President's Cup may refer to:

 2013 President's Cup (Maldives), football
 2013 President's Cup (tennis)